Guy Baldwin, M.S. (b. 1946) is a Los Angeles-based psychotherapist, author, activist, and educator specializing in issues of particular relevance to the BDSM and leather communities. He maintains that inclusion of non-injurious elements of sadomasochism (bondage, flagellation, domination, submission and others) in a consenting sexuality does not itself indicate or confirm mental illness or psycho-sexual dysfunction.

In 1982 Baldwin created a database of professionals who knew about and were not prejudiced against kink and BDSM, called the Kink Aware Professionals list (KAP list). It has been expanded and is now managed by the National Coalition for Sexual Freedom as the Kink And Poly Aware Professionals Directory.

Baldwin has written three books, as well as numerous articles for such magazines as Drummer, Frontiers, Checkmate, International Leatherman, and The Leather Journal.

He is on the Board of Governors for the Leather Hall of Fame.

He is openly gay.

Leather titles 
In 1989, Baldwin held two leather titles: Mr. National Leather Association and International Mr. Leather. He is the only person to have held these two titles in the same year.

Awards 
1994: Received a Pantheon of Leather Southern California Regional Award
 2000: Named a Centurion by the Leather Archives and Museum
 2001: Received a Pantheon of Leather Lifetime Achievement Award
 2004: Inducted into the Society of Janus Hall of Fame
 2007: Received a Pantheon of Leather Forbear Award
 2008: Awarded the Leather Leadership Award by the National Gay and Lesbian Task Force
 2009:  Received the first ever Guy Baldwin Heritage Award, from the Master/slave Conference
 2010: Received the Berman/Schaffer Award from Christopher Street West
 2010: Received a citation from the West Hollywood City Council
 2012: Inducted into the Leather Hall of Fame
 2016: Received a Tom of Finland Foundation Lifetime Achievement Award

Conferences 
2009, 2010, 2012, 2013, and 2019: Special guest at the Master/slave Conference

Bibliography 
Baldwin is a prolific author of both fiction and non-fiction related to BDSM. Baldwin authored a monthly column in Drummer magazine from 1986 to 1993. The column was later compiled in his book Ties that Bind (1993).

Books

Essays
 "A Second Coming Out." Frontiers Magazine (1990). Reprinted in 
 "Old Guard":  Its Origins, Traditions, Mystique & Rules, 
 .
 "Radical Rite" in 
 .

Short fiction
.

Introductions and Forewords
Foreword by Guy Baldwin, M.S., 
Foreword by Guy Baldwin

Interviews (in print)
"The Exiled Self" in

References

External links 
 Leather History Timeline at the Leather Archives and Museum
 
 The Leather Journal website
 Guy Baldwin in the Leatherpedia

1946 births
American male non-fiction writers
American psychotherapists
American relationships and sexuality writers
BDSM writers
American gay writers
Leather subculture
Living people